Quantum University is a private university in Uttarakhand, India. The University was earlier known as Quantum Global Campus Roorkee. The University campus is located in the town of Roorkee with its corporate office in Dehradun.

History

Quantum University Roorkee was founded in 2017 by industrialist Shri Shyam Sunder Goyal. The core programs initially offered by the college were in the disciplines of Engineering and Management. In 2018 the university started programs in Graduate Studies.

Academics
Quantum University provides undergraduate, postgraduate and integrated courses, as well as diploma programmes, through the following schools and departments:. It specialised in IR4.0 Based technology having world class infrastructure in Cyber Security, AI&ML, Data Analytics, Robotics, IoT, Electrical Vehicle Technology, Smart Agriculture, IT Enablement in Management specially CRM and Finance, Graphic Design and VFX. 
The university enjoys technological support from leading giants like Xebia, Palo alto, Certiport US, Salesforce, Automation Anywhere, Microsoft, Oracle, Amazon etc          
 School of Technology
Department of Engineering
Department of Computer Applications
 School of Business
 School of Graduate Studies
 Department of Commerce & Finance
 Department of Sciences
 Department of Humanities & Social Sciences
 School of Agricultural Studies
 School of Media Studies & Design
 School of Health Sciences
 School of Hospitality & Tourism
 School of Law

Location

The University is located outside the town of Roorkee on the Roorkee-Dehradun Highway. Well connected through road network of Delhi to Dehradun.  Neatest Railway station is Saharanpur (30 Min) in UP and Roorkee (30 Min) in Uttarakhand. Nearest Airport is Jolly Grant (45 KM) Dehradun. Quantum University has Three boys hostels (1200 seats) and One Girl Hostel (600 Seats). The campus spreads over an area of 30 acres.

Approval
The university is approved by the Government of Uttarakhand and by the University Grants Commission (UGC).

References

External links
 

Universities in Uttarakhand
Education in Roorkee
Engineering colleges in Uttarakhand
Private universities in India
Universities and colleges in Dehradun
2008 establishments in Uttarakhand
Educational institutions established in 2008